George Alexander Edwards (born 29 July 1992) is an English cricketer, who most recently played for Lancashire.

Edwards is the fifth of six children born to Dennis (1956-2012) and Anne Edwards (b. 1955). He was named after the West Indian cricketer George Headley. He came through the ranks of Surrey, making his first-class debut in 2011 against Cambridge MCCU. He was selected for an ECB training camp in February 2013.

Edwards along with Jack Winslade was released by Surrey towards the end of the 2014 season, with the agreement they could join the MCC Young Cricketers for the 2015 campaign. However, in November 2014 Edwards signed a two-year deal with Lancashire.

References

External links

Living people
Surrey cricketers
English cricketers
1992 births
Lancashire cricketers
People from Lambeth
Cricketers from Greater London
English cricketers of the 21st century